Farzad Esmaili is an Iranian military officer who formerly held office as the commander of the Air Defense Force. He served in the capacity between 2011 and 2018, when he was succeeded by his deputy Alireza Sabahifard. He was subsequently named as the assistant to the Commander-in-Chief of Islamic Republic of Iran Army.

References

Living people
Islamic Republic of Iran Army brigadier generals
1972 births
Commanders of Islamic Republic of Iran Army  Air Defense